Le temple de la Gloire (The Temple of Glory) is an opéra-ballet by Jean-Philippe Rameau with a libretto by Voltaire. The work was first performed in a five-act version on 27 November 1745 at the Grande Écurie, Versailles to celebrate the French victory at the Battle of Fontenoy. It transferred, unsuccessfully, to the Paris Opéra on 7 December 1745. A revised version, in a prologue and three acts, appeared at the Opéra on 19 April 1746.

Roles: 1745 version

Synopsis: 1746 version

Prologue
Scene: The Cave of Envy with the Temple of Glory in the background

Envy and her followers plot to destroy the Temple of Glory but their attack is thwarted by Apollo, the Muses, the demi-gods and heroes. Apollo condemns Envy to be chained eternally to the foot of the temple. The prologue ends with a celebration of peace and the arts.

Act 1: Bélus 
Scene: The grove of the Muses with the Temple of Glory in the background

King Bélus has deserted his love, the princess Lydie, in a quest for glory through brutal military conquest. Lydie seeks consolation with the Muses and the local shepherds and shepherdesses try to comfort her with their dances. Bélus and his warriors arrive. The gods have rejected his claim to enter the Temple of Glory because of his tyranny. Lydie and the shepherds persuade him that a true king should spread happiness among his people rather than wage war.

Act 2: Bacchus
Scene; Outside the Temple of Glory

Bacchus's followers celebrate his conquest of Asia. Bacchus boasts of his invention of wine to his lover Érigone. As he approaches the Temple of Glory the High Priest forbids him to enter: he may have won fame by spreading drunken debauchery but only deeds of virtue bring lasting glory. Undiscouraged, Bacchus and his followers set off on their travels again.

Act 3: Trajan
Scene: The city of Artaxata, partly in ruins. Triumphal arches.

The Emperor Trajan's wife Plautine has followed him to Armenia where he is fighting to crush a rebellion by five kings. Plautine persuades the priests of Mars and the priestesses of Venus to pray for Trajan's success in battle. Trajan returns victorious with the conquered kings in chains, but he magnanimously forgives them and has them freed. Glory descends from the skies to offer Trajan a laurel wreath and the scene changes to her temple. Trajan says he is not worthy of such a great honour and asks for the gods to transform it into the Temple of Happiness for all the world instead.

Recordings

Audio
Le temple de la Gloire (1745 version), Philharmonia Baroque Orchestra & Chorale, conducted by Nicholas McGegan (2 CDs, PBP, 2018)
Le temple de la Gloire (1746 version), Choeur de Chambre de Namur, Les Agrémens, conducted by Guy Van Waas (2 CDs, Ricercar, 2015)
Le temple de la Gloire (1746 version), La Grande Écurie et la Chambre du Roy, conducted by Jean-Claude Malgoire (2 LPs, CBS, 1982)

References

Sources
Original libretto :  Le Temple de la Gloire, Feste donnée à Versailles, le 27 Novembre 1745, Paris, Ballard, 1745  (accessible for free online at Gallica - B.N.F.)
Period manuscript score:  Le Temple de la Gloire, Opéra de M De Voltaire; mis en musique par M Rameau (...), kept at and digitized by the Bibliothèque nationale de France (accessible for free online at Gallica - B.N.F.)
Girdlestone, Cuthbert, Jean-Philippe Rameau: His Life and Work Dover paperback edition, 1969
Holden, Amanda (Ed.), The New Penguin Opera Guide, New York: Penguin Putnam, 2001. 
Sadler, Graham, The New Grove French Baroque Masters Grove/Macmillan, 1988
Rameau Le Site

Operas
French-language operas
Operas by Jean-Philippe Rameau
1745 operas
Opéras-ballets
Ballets by Jean-Philippe Rameau
Operas based on works by Voltaire